The Apple M2 is a series of ARM-based system on a chip (SoC) designed by Apple Inc. as a central processing unit (CPU) and graphics processing unit (GPU) for its Mac desktops and notebooks, and the iPad Pro tablet. An SoC is a single chip that integrates multiple components of a computer or electronic device, such as the CPU, GPU, memory, and input/output interfaces, in a single package. It is the second generation of ARM architecture intended for Apple's Mac computers after switching from Intel Core to Apple silicon, succeeding the M1. Apple announced the M2 on June 6, 2022, at WWDC, along with models of the MacBook Air and the 13-inch MacBook Pro using the M2. It was released on June 24, 2022. The M2 is made with TSMC's "Enhanced 5-nanometer technology" N5P process and contains 20 billion transistors, a 25% increase from the M1. Apple claims CPU improvements up to 18% and GPU improvements up to 35% compared to the M1.  The M2 was followed by the professional-focused M2 Pro and M2 Max chips in January 2023. The M2 Max is a higher-powered version of the M2 Pro, with more GPU cores and memory bandwidth, and a larger die size.

Design

CPU 
The M2 has four high-performance "Avalanche" and four energy-efficient "Blizzard" cores, first seen in the A15 Bionic, providing a hybrid configuration similar to ARM DynamIQ, as well as Intel's Alder Lake and Raptor Lake processors. The high-performance cores have 192 KB of L1 instruction cache and 128 KB of L1 data cache and share a 16 MB L2 cache; the energy-efficient cores have a 128 KB L1 instruction cache, 64 KB L1 data cache, and a shared 4 MB L2 cache. It also has an 8 MB system level cache shared by the GPU. The M2 Pro has 10 or 12 CPU cores, and the M2 Max has 12.

GPU 
The M2 integrates an Apple designed ten-core (or eight-core) graphics processing unit (GPU).  Each GPU core is split into 32 execution units, which each contain eight arithmetic logic units (ALUs). In total, the M2 GPU contains up to 320 execution units or 2,560 ALUs, which have a maximum floating point (FP32) performance of 3.6 TFLOPs. The M2 Pro has 16 or 19 GPU cores, and the M2 Max has 30 or 38.

Memory 
The M2 uses 6,400 MT/s LPDDR5 SDRAM in a unified memory configuration shared by all the components of the processor. The SoC and RAM chips are mounted together in a system-in-a-package design. 8 GB, 16 GB and 24 GB configurations are available.

Other features 
The M2 contains dedicated neural network hardware in a 16-core Neural Engine capable of executing 15.8 trillion operations per second. Other components include an image signal processor, a PCIe storage controller, a Secure Enclave, and a USB4 controller that includes Thunderbolt 3 support.

Supported codecs on the M2 include 8K H.264, 8K H.265 (8/10bit, up to 4:4:4), 8K Apple ProRes, VP9, and JPEG.

Performance and efficiency 

The M2 features faster performance cores and a larger cache than its predecessor, while the efficiency cores have also been improved for greater performance than its predecessor.

Compared to the CPU of the Intel Core i7-1255U, the M2's CPU delivers nearly twice the performance at the same power consumption level. It delivers the peak performance with a quarter of its power consumption level.

Compared to the CPU of the Intel Core i7-1260P, the M2's CPU delivers nearly 90 percent of the peak performance with a quarter of its power consumption level.

Compared to the GPU in the Intel Core i7-1255U, the M2's GPU delivers 2.3 times faster performance at the same power consumption level and matches its peak performance with a fifth of its power consumption level.

Products that use the Apple M2 series

M2 
 MacBook Air (M2, 2022)
 MacBook Pro (13-inch, M2, 2022)
 iPad Pro (11-inch, 6th generation) (2022)
 iPad Pro (12.9-inch, 6th generation) (2022)
 Mac Mini (2023)

M2 Pro 

 MacBook Pro (14-inch and 16-inch, 2023)
 Mac Mini (2023)

M2 Max 

 MacBook Pro (14-inch and 16-inch, 2023)

See also
 Apple silicon
 Apple A15
 Rosetta 2
 Universal 2 binary
 List of Mac models grouped by CPU type

References

Computer-related introductions in 2022
Apple silicon